Atzelgift is an Ortsgemeinde – a community belonging to a Verbandsgemeinde – in the Westerwaldkreis in Rhineland-Palatinate, Germany.

Geography

The community lies in the Westerwald between Limburg and Siegen, and is a recognized health resort (Erholungsort). Through the community flows the river Kleine Nister. Atzelgift belongs to the Verbandsgemeinde of Hachenburg, a kind of collective municipality. Its seat is in the like-named town.

History
In 1396, Atzelgift had its first documentary mention under the name Hatzelgufte.

Politics

The municipal council is made up of 12 council members who were elected by proportional representation in a municipal election on 25 May 2014.

Economy and infrastructure

South of the community runs Bundesstraße 414, which leads from Betzdorf to Hachenburg. The nearest InterCityExpress stop is at the railway station at Montabaur on the Cologne-Frankfurt high-speed rail line.

References

External links
Atzelgift in the collective municipality's Web pages 

Municipalities in Rhineland-Palatinate
Westerwaldkreis